The Narva Bay (also the Gulf of Narva and the Narva Estuary) is a bay in the southern part of the Gulf of Finland divided between Estonia and Russia.

Geography 
The Kurgalsky Peninsula separates it from the Luga Bay to the east. The eastern shore is low and sandy, while the south coast is rather steep. The bay is covered by ice from December to March. The Narva River flows into the bay near the town of Narva-Jõesuu.

See also 
 Udria Landscape Conservation Area

References

Bays of the Baltic Sea
Bays of Estonia
Landforms of Ida-Viru County
Bays of Leningrad Oblast